Craig Leon (born 7 January 1952) is an American-born record producer, composer and arranger currently living in England.<ref name="Routledge 2005">International Who’s Who in Classical Music 2005, Routledge, 2005. </ref> Leon was instrumental in launching the careers of many recording artists including The Ramones, Suicide, Talking Heads and Blondie.

Active in pop music production from 1974 to 1998, Leon has focused on classical composition, orchestration, arrangement and recording from 1998 to the present. His work appears on many classical recordings with artists including Luciano Pavarotti, Andreas Scholl, Sir James Galway, Joshua Bell, The London Chamber Orchestra, Dresden Staatskapelle Orchestra, Sinfonietta Cracovia, The Royal Philharmonic Orchestra and The London Symphony Orchestra.

Career
Craig Leon was born in Miami, Florida, and raised in Fort Myers, Florida. After opening his own recording studio in Miami, Florida, In 1973, he moved to New York when he was hired as assistant to producer Richard Gottehrer at Sire Records. There he was responsible for the discovery and early development of the Ramones and Talking Heads, amongst other artists. In New York, Leon also produced recordings by Blondie, Richard Hell, Suicide and many other artists connected with the burgeoning New York scene. Leon has produced over 150 LP's & CD's of alternative pop music over the years.

In 1981, Leon produced his own first recorded work, "Nommos", which was released on John Fahey’s Takoma Records later that year. This was followed by "Visiting" in 1982, recorded for Enigma Records. After relocating to the UK in late 1983, Leon continued producing pop and alternative recordings, and also wrote and recorded "Klub Anima" for the Kosh Dance Theatre piece. In 1998, Leon produced the comeback No Exit by Blondie.

Since 1998, Leon had been exclusively producing, orchestrating and recording classical projects including work with Luciano Pavarotti, Andreas Scholl and the Orpheus Chamber Orchestra, Elysium, the Vienna Radio Symphony Orchestra, the London Symphony Orchestra, Joshua Bell and the Academy of St Martin in the Fields, and Sir James Galway.

In 2011 Leon completed the Sony Classical recording of Midwinter's Eve: Music For Christmas featuring his orchestrations and arrangements of Christmas music performed by The London Chamber Orchestra conducted by Christopher Warren-Green.

In 2012 he also completed writing, production and arrangement work on the new album by noted Irish folk artist Méav which was released in September 2013 on Atlas Réalisations through Warner Music in Ireland and reached number 3 on the Irish national pop album charts. Worldwide releases to follow in 2014.

As well as numerous UK and foreign television programmes Leon's work has featured in major films including 1917,  The Karate Kid(2010), Ghost River, Ladies in Lavender, 200 Cigarettes, Sid and Nancy and Revenge of the Nerds amongst many others.

Leon has also turned to work combining audio and visual imagery. In 2012 he has completed work as an audio/visual producer and musical director/composer of the PBS broadcast Quest Beyond The Stars which was filmed in the UK and commenced broadcasting in June 2012 and the U.K. produced Discovery Network broadcast "Orbit:Journey to the Moon" which was viewed on the 40th anniversary of the Apollo Moon Landing.

In 2013, Nommos, an avant-garde electronic album that was originally released on Takoma Records in 1981, was reissued as a vinyl-only limited edition paving the way for the full release of both early electronic works written by Leon, "Nommos" and "Visiting", in April 2014. Leon has been performing both works at selected venues in the U.S. and Europe in 2014–16 including Moogfest, the CTM Festival and the Unsound Festival.

He has also completed the production of the opening and closing ceremony for the Dubai World Cup 2014 which was broadcast on 29 March 2014.

An album, Bach to Moog, featuring works of J.S. Bach arranged for the newly reissued Moog model 55 modular synthesizer and performed by Leon with the Sinfonietta Cracovia, was issued on 4 May 2015 by Sony Classical. The recording celebrates the 50th anniversary of the Moog modular synthesizer. The arrangements are for synthesizer, violin and orchestra incorporating the synthesizer as a solo instrument, a member of the ensemble and a processor of the music played by the acoustic instruments.

2016 saw the release of the 40th Anniversary Edition Box Set of the first Ramones album by Warner Music  which was produced by Leon.

A French album of Leon's instrumental arrangements of Christmas music performed by the L'Orchestre d'Auvergne conducted by Craig Leon was released in November 2016 by Harmonia Mundi.

The latest project released on his Atlas Réalisations label distributed through PIAS Classics is The Film Scores and Original Orchestral Music of George Martin, performed by The Berlin Music Ensemble and conducted by Craig Leon which was released on 10 November 2017.

Leon's The Canon: The Anthology of Interplanetary Folk Music Volume 2, is an electronic album released on 10 May 2019 on RVNG Intl.

Discography

Classical records produced, composed or arranged
 The Berlin Music Ensemble conducted by Craig Leon - George Martin: The Film Scores and Original Orchestral Compositions- Atlas Realisations/PIAS
 L'Orchestre d'Auvergne conducted by Craig Leon - Célébration: 10 siècles de musique de Noël Aparte/Harmonia Mundi
 Craig Leon - Bach to Moog Sinfonietta Cracovia (Orchestra) Jennifer Pike ( Violin)Sony Classical
 Various Artists- "Quest Beyond The Stars" Original Soundtrack - Atlas Realisations/Warner Music
 The London Chamber Orchestra / Christopher Warren Green - Craig Leon: Midwinter's Eve: Music For Christmas - Sony Classical
 Joshua Bell / Academy of St Martin in the Fields - Romance of the Violin - Sony Classical 2003
 James Galway / London Symphony Orchestra - Wings of Song - Deutsche Grammophon
Charles Tomlinson Griffes Roman Sketches, Op. 7 No. 3 'The Fountain of the Acqua Paola' arranged by Craig Leon / Erich Korngold - Symphonic Serenade op. 65 - London Symphony Orchestra conducted by S. Pittau - ASV/Universal
 Andreas Scholl and the Orpheus Chamber Orchestra - Wayfaring Stranger - Decca
Ophelié Gaillard and The Royal Philharmonic Orchestra - Dreams Aparte / Harmonia Mundi
 Elysium - Decca
 Various Artists - Cinema Italiano: A New Interpretation Of Italian Film Music - Decca
 Natasha Marsh / London Symphony Orchestra - Amour - EMI Classics
Julia Thornton - Harpistry - EMI Classics
Isobel Cooper - Izzy - Decca
 Isobel Cooper - Izzy - Ascolta/EMI Classics
 Isobel Cooper - Izzy - New Dawn - EMI Classics
Jos Slovick - I Am A Poor Wayfaring Stranger from 1917 (Original Motion Picture Soundtrack) - Sony Classical

Contemporary records produced or co-produced
Ramones – Ramones - Sire
Blondie – Blondie - Chrysalis
Blondie - X Offender (Single) - Private Stock
Suicide – Suicide - Red Star
Richard Hell & The Voidoids – Blank Generation EP - Stiff (UK)
 Various Artists – Live At CBGB's - The Home Of Underground Rock - Atlantic, 1976
Martha Veléz & The Wailers – Escape From Babylon - Phonogram
Chilliwack – Rockerbox - Sire
 Willie Alexander and the Boom Boom Band – MCA
 Willie Alexander and the Boom Boom Band – Meanwhile... Back in the States – MCA
 DMZ—Bomp
The Weirdos – Life of Crime - Bomp
The Zeros- Wimp - Bomp
 Sir Douglas Quintet - Border Wave -Chrysalis
 Sir Douglas Quintet – Live - Chrysalis
 Rodney Crowell - What Will The Neighbours Think – Warner Bros.
 Moon Martin - Escape From Domination – Capitol
 Moon Martin - Shots From A Cold Nightmare – Capitol
 Guy Clark - Heartbroke (single)- Warner Bros.
 Dwight Twilley - Twilley - Arista
 The Roches - Keep On Doing – Warner Bros.
 The Fabulous Thunderbirds - "Tex" Soundtrack – Disney
 The Bangles - Bangles EP - I.R.S. Records
 45 Grave - Sleep In Safety – Enigma
The Fibonnaccis - Tumour EP – Enigma
Arthur Brown And Craig Leon – The Complete Tapes Of Atoya - Plexus,1984
 Berlin - Pleasure Victim (remix) – Geffen
 Berlin - Sex (I'm A...) / The Metro (Craig Leon Remix) - Geffen, 1984
 The Beat Farmers - Van Go - MCA
 Jeffrey Lee Pierce - Wildweed — Statik
 Jeffrey Lee Pierce – Flamingo EP - Statik
 The Sound - Live-Mix
Flesh for Lulu - Blue Sisters Swing EP - Statik
 Flesh for Lulu - Big Fun City - Statik
Doctor & the Medics - Laughing at The Pieces - I.R.S. Records
 Doctor & the Medics – Spirit in the Sky - I.R.S. Records
The Pogues - Haunted - Sid & Nancy Soundtrack - MCA
The Men They Couldn't Hang - Ghosts of Cable Street - MCA
Andy Pawlak - Shoebox Full of Secrets — Fontana
The Go Betweens - Tallulah - Beggars Banquet
 Spy vs Spy – Trash the Planet – WEA
Snakeman Show / Sheena & The Rokkets – Snakeman Show In The '90s (The Adrian Sherwood Remix) / Sheena & The Rokkets In The '90s (The Craig Leon Remix) - Alfa Records, 1991
Gamine - Dream Boy - Barclay (France)
The Primitives - Lovely - RCA
 Adult Net - The Honey Tangle - Phonogram, 1989
Intastella - Intastella And The Family Of People - MCA
The Chameleons - Script of The Bridge - Statik
The Sound - Live - Statik
 The Records - Crashes - Atlantic
 The Records – Teenarama – Remix - Atlantic
John Trubee - Blind Man’s Penis - Enigma
Brave Combo - Urban Grown-ups EP - Four Dots
Shawn Phillips - Live -RCA
Mark Owen - Green Man – BMG, 1996
 Mark Owen - Child (single) – BMG
 Mark Owen - Clementine (single) - BMG
 Cowboy Junkies - Miles From Our Home [String Arrangements - Craig Leon] - Geffen
 Martin Phillipps & The Chills - Sunburnt — Flying Nun, 1996
Cobalt 60 (Front 242) - Elemental CD - Edel
Psyched Up Janis - Swell - Replay Records
 Angel Corpus Christi - Candy 12" Remix - Almo
 Angel Corpus Christi - White Courtesy Phone - Almo
 Eugenius - Mary Queen of Scots - Atlantic
Giorgia Fumanti - From My Heart – EMI
Kid Creole and the Coconuts - KC2 Plays K2C - Sony (Japan)
 Front 242 - 06:21:03:11 Up Evil - PIAS/Epic (1993)
 The Fall - Code: Selfish - Phonogram
 The Fall - Shiftwork - Phonogram, 1991
 The Fall - Extricate - Phonogram, 1990
 New F.A.D. (Fast Automatic Daffodils) - Body Exit Mind — PIAS/Elektra
 Jesus Jones - Liquidizer - EMI
 Shonen Knife - Let's Knife - Virgin
Phillip Boa & The Voodooclub - Helios - Polydor (Germany)
 Phillip Boa & The Voodooclub - Boaphenia - Polydor (Germany)
Blondie - No Exit – BMG
 Blondie - Maria (single) - BMG
 The Cesarians – Cesarians 1 – Imprint
 Steve Hogarth – Ice Cream Genius – Poison Apple, 1997
 Bell'aria - Little Italy - EMI
 The Thought – The Thought – MCA
 Méav – The Calling – Atlas Realisations/Warner

 Recordings performed 
 Craig Leon - The Canon: The Anthology of Interplanetary Folk Music Vol. 2 - RVNG Intl., 2019
Berlin Music Ensemble conducted by Craig Leon - George Martin: The Film Scores And Original Orchestral Music Of George Martin - Atlas Realisations/PIAS, 2018
 Orchestre d’Auvergne / Craig Leon (arrangements & direction) - CÉLÉBRATION: 10 siècles de musique de Noël - Aparté / Harmonia Mundi, 2016
 Craig Leon - Bach To Moog (A Realisation For Electronics And Orchestra) | Sinfonietta Cracovia (Orchestra), Jennifer Pike (Violin) - Sony Classical, 2015
 Craig Leon - Early Electronic Works-Nommos/Visiting - Atlas / Aparté / Harmonia Mundi
 Craig Leon - Nommos/Visiting - The Anthology of Interplanetary Folk Music Vol. 1 - RVNG Intl.
 Craig Leon - Nommos - Takoma
 Craig Leon - Visiting - Arbitor/Enigma
 Craig Leon - Klub Anima Sound Track-Psi
Cassell Webb - Llano - Virgin
 Cassell Webb - The Thief of Sadness - Venture
 Cassell Webb - Songs of a Stranger - Virgin
 Cassell Webb - Conversation At Dawn - Virgin
 Cassell Webb - House of Dreams - China Records

References

Further reading
 Massey, Howard. Behind the Glass(Top Record Producers Tell How They Craft the Hits), Miller Freeman, 2000. 
 True, Everett. Hey Ho Let’s Go (The Story of the Ramones)'', Omnibus, 2002.

External links
 
 Downtown Music Publishing Roster

1952 births
Living people
Record producers from Florida
20th-century classical composers
21st-century classical composers
American male classical composers
American expatriates in the United Kingdom
Musicians from Miami
21st-century American composers
20th-century American composers
20th-century American male musicians
21st-century American male musicians